R619 road may refer to:
 R619 road (Ireland)
 R619 (South Africa)